Vrion is village in Vlorë County, southwestern Albania. It is part of the municipality Finiq. It is located to the east of Sarandë,  next to the village of Metoq.
Vrion is inhabited solely by Greeks.

Etymology
The name of the village is of Albanian origin.

References

Populated places in Finiq
Greek communities in Albania
Villages in Vlorë County